The film industries of the 54 countries that make up Africa produced over two hundred feature films in 2014. This article fully lists all non-pornographic films, including short films, that had a release date in that year and which were at least partly made by an African country. It does not include films first released in previous years that had release dates in 2014. Nor does it include films made in countries such as France, Spain or the United Kingdom, which though they have territories in Africa are primarily non-African states, unless they are co-productions with African countries.  Also included is an overview of the major events in African film, including film festivals and awards ceremonies, as well as lists of those films that have been particularly well received, both critically and financially. The year was particularly notable for the release of Timbuktu, the first Mauritanian film ever nominated for the Academy Award for best foreign language film.

Major Releases

Minor Releases

Co-Productions

Critical reception

Metacritic

IMDb

African Film Awards

 Africa Movie Academy Awards (26 April)
 Africa Magic Viewers' Choice Awards (8 March)
 Best of Nollywood Awards (11 October)
 Cameroon Academy Awards
 Ghana Movie Awards
 Golden Icons Academy Movie Awards (25 October)
 Kenya Film & TV Awards
 Nollywood and African Film Critics Awards (13 September)
 Nollywood Movies Awards (18 October)
 South African Film and Television Awards
 Tanit d'or
 Zulu African Film Academy Awards (8 November)

See also

 2014 in film
 Cinema of Africa
 List of Nigerian films of 2014
 List of Algerian submissions for the Academy Award for Best Foreign Language Film
 List of Egyptian submissions for the Academy Award for Best Foreign Language Film
 List of Moroccan submissions for the Academy Award for Best Foreign Language Film
 List of Sub-Saharan African submissions for the Academy Award for Best Foreign Language Film
 List of Tunisian submissions for the Academy Award for Best Foreign Language Film

References

External links
 - Algeria
 - Angola
 - Benin
 - Botswana
 - Burkina Faso
 - Burundi
 - Cameroon
 - Cape Verde
 - Central African Republic
 - Chad
 - Comoros
 - Congo
 - Democratic Republic of Congo
 - Djibouti
 - Egypt
 - Equatorial Guinea
 - Eritrea
 - Ethiopia
 - Gabon
 - Gambia
 - Ghana
 - Guinea
 - Guinea-Bissau
 - Ivory Coast
 - Kenya
 - Lesotho
 - Liberia
 - Libya
 - Madagascar
 - Malawi
 - Mali
 - Mauritania
 - Mauritius
 - Morocco
 - Western Sahara
 - Mozambique
 - Namibia
 - Niger
 - Nigeria
 - Rwanda
 - São Tomé and Príncipe
 - Senegal
 - Seychelles
 - Sierra Leone
 - Somalia
 - South Africa
 - Seychelles
 - Sudan
 - Swaziland
 - Tanzania
 - Togo
 - Tunisia
 - Uganda
 - Zambia
 - Zimbabwe

African
Films
2014